James Coupe (Jem) Shaw (11 April 1836 – 7 March 1888) was an English professional cricketer who played for Nottinghamshire from 1865 to 1875  making 115 appearances. According to WG Grace, few bowlers had a better record.

Shaw was born at Sutton-in-Ashfield, Nottinghamshire. He joined Nottinghamshire in 1865 and played every consecutive Notts game over a ten-year period. He also made numerous appearances in representative teams such as the Players in the Gentlemen v Players series, the North of England cricket team and the All-England Eleven.  He played against W G Grace many times and had some successes, including twice dismissing him for nought in 1871.  Grace said after the second of these that he "would pay particular attention to J C Shaw".  In the next innings, Grace scored a double-century.  Shaw's comment afterwards was famous for its ruefulness and it has often been quoted: "I puts the ball where I likes and he puts it where he likes".

Shaw was a left-arm round arm  fast bowler and took 642 first-class wickets at an average of 14.41 and a best performance of 9 for 86. WG Grace noted that he had a high-delivery  that was sometimes difficult to play, and brought his arm from behind with a very quick action making it difficult to see. Shaw still has the best ever bowling figures for Nottinghamshire, taking 10 wickets for 20 runs in a match against an England XI in 1870  He was a right-hand batsman  and played 176 innings in 115 matches with an average of 4.24 and a top score of 18 not out.  Grace described him as a very poor bat – in fact Shaw did not reach double figures until his seventy-second first-class innings, setting a record since equalled only by Eric Hollies for consecutive single-figure innings. Indeed, for Nottinghamshire Shaw reached double figures only once in 109 visits to the crease.

Shaw died at Sutton-in-Ashfield, Nottinghamshire, at the age of 51.

References

External links

Bibliography
 Simon Rae, W G Grace: A Life, Faber & Faber, 1998

1836 births
1888 deaths
English cricketers
Nottinghamshire cricketers
Players cricketers
Players of the North cricketers
All-England Eleven cricketers
Married v Single cricketers
Non-international England cricketers
Left-Handed v Right-Handed cricketers
North v South cricketers
R. Daft's XI cricketers
Cricketers from Sutton-in-Ashfield